Ivan Dodig was the defending champion, but lost in the quarterfinals to Marcos Baghdatis.

Third-seeded Mikhail Youzhny beat unseeded Lukáš Lacko in straight sets to take the 2012 title.

Seeds

Draw

Finals

Top half

Bottom half

Qualifying

Seeds

Qualifiers

Qualifying draw

First qualifier

Second qualifier

Third qualifier

Fourth qualifier

References 
Main Draw
Qualifying Draw

2012 Singles
PBZ Zagreb Indoors - Singles
2012 PBZ Zagreb Indoors